Eucapperia bullifera is a moth of the family Pterophoroidea. It is found in Tanzania, South Africa and Madagascar.

The wingspan is 14–19 mm. The moth flies in November.

References

External links
Ten new species of Afrotropical Pterophoridae (Lepidoptera)

Oxyptilini
Moths of Madagascar
Moths of Africa
Insects of Tanzania
Moths described in 1918